Dambach-la-Ville is a commune in the Bas-Rhin department in Alsace in north-eastern France.

It lies northwest of Sélestat, on the eastern slopes of the Vosges mountains.

Dambach-la-Ville is known for its quality wines.

History 

The village was first recorded in 1125 as Tambacum. In the thirteenth century, the Bishop of Strasbourg, made Dambach annex two local villages, Altenwiller and Oberkirch. The  is located in what used to be Oberkirch.

Demography

Twin towns
Dambach-la-Ville is twinned with:
  Wemding, Germany - 1988

Wine
Dambach-la-Ville is the largest wine-producing village in Alsace. Its  vineyards produce one of the finest Alsacian wines: the Grand Cru .

Notable residents 

 Gédéon Geismar

See also
Communes of the Bas-Rhin department

References

External links

 Town council website
 Wine producer J.HAULLER & Fils - Vins d'Alsace

Communes of Bas-Rhin
Bas-Rhin communes articles needing translation from French Wikipedia